Robert Houstoun Anderson (October 1, 1835 – February 8, 1888) was a West Point graduate, an infantry officer in the United States Army and later served as a Brigadier General in the Confederate States Army during the American Civil War, After the war he served as the Chief of the Police for the city of Savannah for 23 years and was twice appointed to serve on the Visitor's Board of the United States Military Academy at West Point, New York, NY. He played an important role with reunification efforts after the war.

Early life
Born in Savannah, Georgia, on October 1, 1835, Anderson was the son of John Wayne Anderson, a local businessman. His siblings include Major George Wayne Anderson, Captain J. W. Anderson II, and Colonel C. W. Anderson. He was educated in the local schools before receiving an appointment to the United States Military Academy. "Bob" Anderson would return to West Point one day to help heal the wounds that the civil war would bring, as a member of the Board of Visitors after the war.

US Army Service
After graduation from West Point in 1857, Anderson was made brevet second lieutenant with the 9th U.S. Infantry Regiment, but was immediately detached to become a cavalry instructor at West Point. Later he was stationed in upstate New York at Fort Columbus with the 9th Infantry. He later served as an infantry second lieutenant at Fort Walla Walla in the Washington Territory on frontier duty from 1858-1861.

Confederate States Army Service

In March 1861, shortly before the official secession of his home state, Anderson left the US Army and accepted a commission as a lieutenant of artillery in the Confederate Army, formally resigning his U.S. Army commission on May 17, 1861.

In September 1861 he was promoted to the rank of Major, and was acting adjutant general of the troops on the Georgia coast. Anderson was then appointed assistant adjutant general to Maj. Gen. W. H. T. Walker of the Georgia State militia located in Pensacola, Florida. When Walker's brigade was transferred to Virginia to join the Army of Northern Virginia in July 1861, Anderson went with him.

After Walker resigned, Anderson remained in Confederate service and was promoted to the rank of Major. In April 1862 Major Anderson formed the 1st Georgia Sharpshooter Battalion, and quickly built them into an effective and disciplined unit. The battalion was mustered at Camp Anderson, on the banks of the Ogeechee River. In early 1863 he and was placed in command of nearby Fort McAllister, located just downriver from Savannah, Georgia to help slow the advancing Union ironclads. Fort McAllister was one of the key forts defending the port of Savannah, and would become the biggest obstacle in Sherman's March to the Sea.

Anderson was promoted to colonel and being placed in command of the 5th Georgia Cavalry. on January 20, 1863. He led Confederate defenses at the Battle of Fort McAllister (1863). General P. G. T. Beauregard in his official report to the war department, commended very highly the conduct of officers and men engaged in the successful defense of Fort McAllister in February 1863.

Anderson and the 5th Georgia Cavalry were transferred to the Army of Tennessee under General William W. Allen as part of Kelly's Division, under General Joseph Wheeler before the opening of the Atlanta Campaign. Anderson earned a battlefield promotion to brigadier general of Cavalry on July 26, 1864. He was wounded at the Battle of Brown's Mill near Newnan, Georgia on July 30, 1864, during the Atlanta Campaign. He rejoined his command at Briar Creek, fighting with Johnston and Hood. After the death of commanding officer Brig. Gen. John H. Kelly near Franklin, Tennessee, Anderson assumed temporary command of the division later resuming his position as brigade commander. He was wounded again at Fayetteville, North Carolina during the Carolinas Campaign, on March 11, 1865.

Anderson would later lead his brigade against advancing Union forces, being wounded for a third time at the Battle of Griswoldville. Then he joined Wheeler's Cavalry Corps in the Carolinas Campaign before the collapse of the Confederacy in April 1865. He surrendered with Johnston's army at Hillsboro, North Carolina, surrendering to General William T. Sherman on April 26, 1865, 17 days after Lee's surrender at Appomattox.

Postbellum career

Following the war, Anderson established and served as the police chief for the city of Savannah from 1865-1888. As Chief of Police for the city of Savannah, he brought order and through his leadership made the force one of the most effective in the nation. After founding the Georgia Sabre Club, Anderson was elected to Captain of the Georgia Hussars from December 4, 1876, to February 1880.

General Anderson was appointed by President Rutherford B. Hayes to the Board of Visitors, US Military Academy at West Point in 1879. The Board of Visitors is a panel that includes Senators, Congressional Representatives, and presidential appointees who "shall inquire into the morale and discipline, curriculum, instruction, physical equipment, fiscal affairs, academic methods, and other matters relating to the academy that the board decides to consider."  As a member of the board, he chaired the committee for academics and discipline, and working alongside General "Fighting Joe" Wheeler helped reunite old friends, and assisted with reconciliation efforts. He was appointed again to the Board by the next president, Grover Cleveland in 1887 when they recommended bringing both the telephone and electricity to West Point.

As Police Chief, Anderson employed mostly veterans from both sides of the civil war in his force, putting his words of reconciliation into action.

Robert Houstoun Anderson died in Savannah, Georgia the age of 52 on February 8, 1888, and was buried at Bonaventure Cemetery. An estimated seven thousand people attended the unveiling of a copper and granite monument, crowned with a bust of the general at Bonaventure Cemetery in February 1894. He is buried there with his wife and children beside him.  His son Robert Houstoun Anderson Jr. also served in the U.S. Army with distinction on the Mexican border, and in China before his death due to disease in the Philippines in 1901.

Gallery

See also

 5th Georgia Cavalry
 Battle of Fort McAllister (1863)
 Republican Blues
 Georgia Hussars
 List of American Civil War generals (Confederate)

Notes

References
 Brown, Russell K., Our Connection with Savannah - A History of the 1st Battalion Georgia Sharpshooters. Macon, GA: Mercer University Press, 2004. 
 Eicher, John H., and David J. Eicher, Civil War High Commands. Stanford: Stanford University Press, 2001. .
 Evans, Clement A., ed. Confederate Military History: A Library of Confederate States History. 12 vols. Atlanta: Confederate Publishing Company, 1899. Vol. 7 Wheeler, Joseph; Alabama. p. 392 . Retrieved January 20, 2011.
 Linedecker, Clifford L., Civil War, A-Z: The Complete Handbook of America's Bloodiest Conflict. New York: Ballantine Books, 2002. 
 Smith, Derek, Civil War Savannah. Savannah, GA: Frederic C. Beil, 
 Warner, Ezra J. Generals in Gray: Lives of the Confederate Commanders. Baton Rouge: Louisiana State University Press, 1959. .

External links

Bio of Robert H. Anderson
US Military Academy at West Point, Board of Visitors 
Board of Visitors Report for 1887
Gravesite location Google Maps

1835 births
1888 deaths
Military personnel from Savannah, Georgia
United States Army officers
Confederate States Army brigadier generals
United States Military Academy alumni
People of Georgia (U.S. state) in the American Civil War
Southern Historical Society